Nedyus is a genus of minute seed weevils in the beetle family Curculionidae. There are more than 50 described species in Nedyus.

Species
These 55 species belong to the genus Nedyus:

 Nedyus apicalis O'Brien & Wibmer, 1982
 Nedyus asperifoliarum Stephens, 1829
 Nedyus assimilis Stephens, 1829
 Nedyus atticus Colonnelli, 1994
 Nedyus borraginis Stephens, 1829
 Nedyus caliginosus Stephens, 1831
 Nedyus chloropterus Stephens, 1831
 Nedyus chrysanthemi Stephens, 1829
 Nedyus cinereus Stephens, 1829
 Nedyus cochleariae Stephens, 1831
 Nedyus constrictus Stephens, 1831
 Nedyus contractus Stephens, 1829
 Nedyus crux Stephens, 1829
 Nedyus depressicollis Stephens, 1829
 Nedyus detritus Stephens, 1829
 Nedyus didymus Schoenherr, 1825
 Nedyus distinctepubens Colonnelli, 1981
 Nedyus echii Stephens, 1829
 Nedyus ericae Stephens, 1829
 Nedyus erysimi Stephens, 1829
 Nedyus flavicaudis (Boheman, 1844)
 Nedyus floralis Stephens, 1831
 Nedyus horridus Stephens, 1831
 Nedyus leucomelanus Stephens, 1829
 Nedyus litura Stephens, 1829
 Nedyus marginatus Stephens, 1829
 Nedyus melanarius Stephens, 1829
 Nedyus melanostigma Stephens, 1829
 Nedyus monostigma Stephens, 1829
 Nedyus neophytus Faust, 1887
 Nedyus nigrinus Stephens, 1829
 Nedyus nigritus Stephens, 1831
 Nedyus obstrictus Stephens, 1829
 Nedyus ovalis Stephens, 1829
 Nedyus pallidactylus Stephens, 1829
 Nedyus phaeorhynchus Stephens, 1829
 Nedyus phaeorynchus Stephens, 1831
 Nedyus pollinarius Stephens, 1831
 Nedyus pusio Stephens, 1829
 Nedyus pyrrhorhynchus Stephens, 1831
 Nedyus quadrimaculatus (Linnaeus & C., 1758)
 Nedyus quercicola Stephens, 1831
 Nedyus rudis Pic, 1896
 Nedyus ruficrus Stephens, 1829
 Nedyus rugulosus Stephens, 1831
 Nedyus salicis
 Nedyus scutellatus Stephens, 1829
 Nedyus sisymbrii Stephens, 1829
 Nedyus spiniger Stephens, 1831
 Nedyus sulculus Stephens, 1831
 Nedyus suturalis Stephens, 1833
 Nedyus sysimbrii Stephens, 1829
 Nedyus troglodytes Stephens, 1831
 Nedyus uniguttatus Stephens, 1831
 Nedyus vitiosus (Dietz, 1896)

References

Further reading

External links

 

Ceutorhynchini
Articles created by Qbugbot